PWU may refer to:

Pacific Western University (California)
Pacific Western University (Hawaii)
Państwowe Wytwórnie Uzbrojenia or State Arms Factories
Paranur railway station, Tamil Nadu, India (station code)
Pennsylvania Western University or Penn West
Philippine Women's University (Manila, Philippines)
Powerloom Workers Union